Delphin Bugigi Kyubwa is a political movement leader in the Democratic Republic of Congo, the chairman of Party for National Reform (PNR).

External links
Matinée politique du PNR à Kinshasa, Le Potentiel-7011 Edition of Friday, December 31,2010
La Prosperiteonline: Delphin Kyubwa accueilli triomphalement pour le combat électoral !
Congomaboke: Delphin Kyubwa accueilli triomphalement pour le combat électoral! 
Allafrica.com: Le PNR dénonce le détournement des fonds et dons destinés aux victimes de Sange
Le Potentiel-6005 Edition of Friday, October 8, 2010

Living people
Year of birth missing (living people)
Democratic Republic of the Congo politicians
21st-century Democratic Republic of the Congo people